Alderson may refer to:

Places
Alderson, Oklahoma, a US town
Alderson, West Virginia, a US town
Alderson Federal Prison Camp
Alderson, Alberta, a ghost town in Canada

Other uses
Alderson (surname)

People
Charles Alderson, linguist

See also
 Alderson drive, a fictional interstellar transport drive 
 Alderson disk, a fictional artificial astronomical megastructure